Naile Sultan may refer to:
 Naile Sultan (daughter of Abdulmejid I) (1856-1882), Ottoman Princess
 Naile Sultan (daughter of Abdul Hamid II) (1884-1957), Ottoman Princess